The entomologist Gustaf von Paykull described the crab plover in Kongl. Vetenskaps Akademiens Handlingar Stockholm
 Marie Jules César Savigny published  an account of the sacred ibis titled  Histoire naturelle et mythologique de l'ibis
 King Island emu became extinct in the wild.
 Eugenius Johann Christoph Esper  became professor of zoology and director of the zoology museum  at Erlangen university.
 Johann Gotthelf Fischer von Waldheim founded the Société Impériale des Naturalistes de Moscou.
Anselme Gaëtan Desmarest  published

Ongoing events
Louis Jean Pierre Vieillot Histoire naturelle des plus beaux oiseaux chanteur de la zone torride Birds described in this work in 1805 include the black-bellied seedcracker, the orange weaver and the black-necked weaver

Birding and ornithology by year
1805 in science